Muppets Now is an American television series produced by The Muppets Studio for the streaming service Disney+. Directed by Kirk Thatcher, the series is an improvisational comedy based on The Muppets franchise by Jim Henson. It premiered on July 31, 2020.

Premise
Muppets Now is a series consisting of multiple different segments bridged together by a framing device featuring Scooter. The segments include a game show, a cooking show, and a talk show. The series was marketed as unscripted, but several writers are credited. The show sees the debut of two new characters, Joe the Legal Weasel and Beverly Plume.

Segments
The segments include:

 Lifesty(le) with Miss Piggy - Miss Piggy offers lifestyle tips with assistance from Uncle Deadly, Taye Diggs, Linda Cardellini, and various other Muppet and celebrity guests. The segment is divided into smaller segments including “Try it with Taye Diggs” in which Piggy and Taye Diggs try beauty regimes or exotic foods and “Le Chat Room” where Miss Piggy discusses the given topic with Linda Cardellini and two other muppets (usually one of which is a random non-anthropomorphic animal or anthropomorphic inanimate object). It appears in all episodes.
 Økėÿ Døkęÿ Køøkïñ - Hosted by turkey Beverly Plume, the Swedish Chef competes against celebrity chefs. It appears in five of the six episodes.
 Muppet Masters - Walter discovers the Muppets' hidden talents. It appears in episodes 1 and 5
 Mup Close and Personal - A different Muppet each time attempts to have an in-depth conversation with a celebrity guest. It appears in episodes 1, 4, and 6.
 Muppet Labs Field Test - Dr. Bunsen Honeydew and Beaker take their experiments out into the open. These are preceded by safety warnings with Kermit and Joe the Legal Weasel. Parts of the segments feature animated muppets as famous historical figures. It appears in all episodes except the first.
 Pepe's Unbelievable Game Show - Scooter has come up with a long list of rules for Pepe the King Prawn's game show, but Pepe himself would rather just make it up as he goes along, to Scooter's annoyance. It appears in episodes 2, 3 and 5.

Cast

Muppet performers

 Matt Vogel as
 Kermit the Frog, the leader of the Muppets and Miss Piggy’s ex.
 Uncle Deadly, Miss Piggy's long-suffering, over-dramatic, thespian personal assistant.
 Camilla the Chicken, Gonzo's chicken girlfriend.
 Floyd Pepper, the laid back, sarcastic bass guitarist of The Electric Mayhem.
 Cacti
 Eric Jacobson as
 Fozzie Bear, Kermit's best friend, a naive, struggling comedian.
 Miss Piggy, the self-centred host of "Lifestyle with Miss Piggy" and Kermit’s ex.
 Animal, the wild drummer of The Electric Mayhem.
 Sam Eagle, a patriotic eagle.
 A Mole who appears in the second installment of "Økėÿ Døkęÿ Køøkïñ".
 Cacti
 Dave Goelz as
 The Great Gonzo, an eccentric daredevil and Camilla's boyfriend with unusual interests.
 Dr. Bunsen Honeydew, a scientist and the host of "Muppet Labs Field Test".
 Waldorf, an elderly critic.
 Chip, the I.T. guy.
 Beauregard, a dim-witted, clumsy janitor of indeterminate species.
 Zoot, the often-sleepy saxophonist of The Electric Mayhem.
 Bill Barretta as
 Pepe the King Prawn, a sly and feisty, scheming King Prawn and the host of "Pepe's Unbelievable Game Show" who speaks with a heavy Spanish accent.
 The Swedish Chef, a nonsensical chef who is the star of "Økėÿ Døkęÿ Køøkïñ" and speaks mock Swedish.
 Big Mean Carl, a greedy green monster who will eat anything and everything.
 Howard Tubman, a rich pig and RuPaul superfan who appears in the first episode, interrupting Kermit's interview with his idol.
 Bubba the Rat, a butch rat and friend of Yolanda.
 Bobo the Bear, an absent-minded, easy-going bear.
 Dr. Teeth, the outlandish leader and keyboardist of The Electric Mayhem.
 Baby
 David Rudman as
 Scooter, the co-host of "Pepe's Unbelievable Game Show" and the producer of Muppets Now whose job is to upload the show onto Disney+ in time.
 Beaker, the co-host of "Muppet Labs Field Test" and the victim of Bunsen's experiments.
 Janice, the chilled-out, offbeat lead guitarist of The Electric Mayhem.
 Miss Poogy, a member of the Moopets and Miss Piggy's doppelgänger.
 Baby
 Peter Linz as
 Walter, the host of "Muppet Masters".
 Statler, an elderly critic.
 Link Hogthrob, a wanna-be heartthrob and dim-witted pig.
 Joe the Legal Weasel, the Muppets' new legal counsel. His main role in the series is in segments preceding "Muppet Labs Field Test", where he and Kermit warn the viewers to not try Bunsen and Beaker's experiments at home.
 Robin the Frog, Kermit's nephew and the muppets’ social media moderator.
 Beepalyzer, a lonely, outdated computer who appears in the third installment of "Muppet Labs Field Test".
 Foo-Foo, Miss Piggy's pet dog.
 Julianne Buescher as
 Yolanda the Rat
 Beverly Plume, a turkey who is the host of "Økėÿ Døkęÿ Køøkïñ". She also appears in the fifth installment of "Lifestyle with Miss Piggy".
 Margaret, a Whatnot beautician who appears in "Lifestyle with Miss Piggy".
 Rosie the Sheep, who appears in "Lifestyle with Miss Piggy".
 Beak-R, Bunsen's new high tech assistant who appears in the first installment of "Muppet Labs Field Test".
 Priscilla the Chicken
 Brie the Cheese
 Elena the Penguin
 Some Bunny
 A Screaming Goat
 Esther
 Mary the Cow
 Mike Quinn

Additional cast
 Piotr Michael as the announcer for "Mup Close and Personal" (voice)
 Matthew Barnette as a Delivery Man
 Cissy Jones
 Carolyn Gardner as the voice of the customer service operator for the "High Pressure Helpline"

Contestants on "Pepe's Unbelievable Gameshow"
 Brie Carter
 Artoun Nazerith
 Daniel Montgomery
 Niko Posey
 Edward Mawere
 Karina Yzobel

Guest stars
 Taye Diggs
 Linda Cardellini
 RuPaul
 Carlina Will
 Danny Trejo
 Roy Choi
 Al Madrigal
 Aubrey Plaza
 Giuseppe Losavio
 Marina Michelson
 Seth Rogen

Production

Development
On August 23, 2019, Disney announced a short-form unscripted series starring The Muppets titled Muppets Now. On December 22, 2019, director Kirk Thatcher said that the series will approach "three different types of shows". The series was originally filmed as several shorts, meant to be released individually but they were put together into 6 episodes with framing material featuring Scooter.

Filming
Production on Muppets Now began on June 8, 2019 and lasted approximately six days. Thatcher serves as director for the series.

Episodes

Season 1 (2020)

Release
Muppets Now premiered on July 31, 2020, on Disney+ and consisted of six episodes.

Marketing
On August 23, 2019, during the series' official announcement, a promotional teaser featuring Kermit the Frog and a Muppet named Joe the Legal Weasel was shown at the D23 Expo. On January 1, 2020, footage of the series was released in a video featuring original Disney+ content set to be released through the year. The official trailer was released on June 24, 2020.

Reception
On the review aggregation website Rotten Tomatoes, the series has an approval rating of 69% based on 51 reviews, with an average rating of 6.50/10. The critical consensus reads, "Though Muppets Nows formulaic sketches fail to showcase The Muppets' chaotic charms, it's entertaining enough to suggest that with looser reins - and a lot more music - it could become the best reboot in years." On Metacritic, the series has a weighted average score of 68 out of 100, based on 27 critics, indicating "generally favorable reviews."

Daniel Fienberg of The Hollywood Reporter found that Muppets Now manages to provide a humor that aims an all-age audience, and claimed that the series succeeds to capture the state of disorder that makes the Muppets prosper through its different segments. Judy Berman of Time claimed that the series provides a very effective humor through its segments, while stating that despite not being enthusiastic and sophisticated like The Muppet Show, Muppets Now stays a soothing series that succeeded at keeping the Muppets characters suitable through time. Lucy Mangan of The Guardian rated Muppets Now 4 out of 5 stars, found the series to be the best work from The Muppets franchise since The Muppet Show, and praised the humor of the different segments. Polly Conway of Common Sense Media rated the series 4 out of 5 stars, stating: "Muppets Now is a family-friendly show about the Muppets trying to put together their own streaming series. Made up of different segments -- like Lifesty (sorry, Lifestyle) with Miss Piggy, a cooking show with the Swedish Chef, and many more -- the show features the Muppet crew getting up to their usual hijinks, with a modern twist. Like much Muppet fare, it's slightly edgy, with some very mild innuendo (a Muppet fan tells RuPaul he "just wants to touch him") and cartoonish violence in the form of slapstick and pratfalls. The series is fast-paced, light, and fun; families who are Muppet fans will be pleased to see this return to form from their favorite gang of now media-savvy puppet friends." Kristen Lopez of IndieWire gave the series a C+ rating, found different the segments of the series to be very entertaining, and complimented the chemistry between the Muppets and the guests, but stated that the series does not use the Muppets at their full potential.

References

External links
 
 
 

2020 American television series debuts
2020 American television series endings
2020s American comedy television series
American television shows featuring puppetry
Disney+ original programming
English-language television shows
Improvisational television series
The Muppets television series
Television series reboots